Igor Vladimirovich Bakhtin (born 12 February 1973) is a Russian professional football coach and a former player. He is the manager of the Under-21 squad of FC Orenburg.

Club career
He made his professional debut in the Soviet Second League in 1991 for FC Uralets Nizhny Tagil.

European club competitions
 UEFA Intertoto Cup 1996 with FC Uralmash Yekaterinburg: 5 games.
 UEFA Intertoto Cup 1999 with FC Rostselmash Rostov-on-Don: 2 games, 1 goal.

References

1973 births
Sportspeople from Krasnoyarsk
Living people
Soviet footballers
Association football midfielders
Association football defenders
Russian footballers
FC Ural Yekaterinburg players
Russian Premier League players
FC Elista players
FC Rostov players
FC Amkar Perm players
Russian football managers
FC Uralets Nizhny Tagil players